Even Serpents Shine is the second studio album by English power pop band The Only Ones, released in 1979 by Columbia Records. It was produced by Peter Perrett and Alan Mair.

The album was re-released in the United Kingdom in 2009 on Sony Music Entertainment, featuring bonus content. The reissue was a CD which comprises 14-tracks. It includes the original album digitally remastered from the original 1/2" mix tapes; alongside three bonus tracks.

Critical reception

The album has consistently been praised by critics. In a retrospective review for AllMusic, critic Mark Deming wrote that "Even Serpents Shine doesn't boast an out-of-the-box classic tune along the lines of 'Another Girl, Another Planet' from the self-titled debut, but in many respects, this is the more consistent album, achieving a similar degree of thematic and melodic variety while generating a more coherent sound and feeling," adding that "they were one of the very few bands of their time and place who inarguably beat the sophomore slump."

Reviewing the album for BBC Music, Chris Jones wrote, "Musically the band were always a step ahead of the pack. Mike Kellie and Alan Mair – both seasoned pros on drums and bass – never falter, allowing John Perry's guitar to fly; while John 'Rabbit' Bundrick's organ adds just the right dollop of Al Kooper-isms."

Track listing

Personnel
The Only Ones
Peter Perrett – lead and background vocals, guitars
John Perry – guitars, keyboards
Alan Mair – bass guitars
Mike Kellie – drums

Session musicians
Adam Maitland – keyboards, saxophone
John "Rabbit" Bundrick – keyboards
Koulla Kakoulli – backing vocals

Production
Peter Perrett – production
Alan Mair – production
Andy Lyden – engineering
Kevin Dallimore – engineering
Michael Beal – cover, art direction, design

Charts

References

External links

1979 albums
The Only Ones albums
Albums produced by Alan Mair
Columbia Records albums